John Lagey (20 April 1920 – 19 January 1994), better known by his ring name Johnny Kwango, was an English professional wrestler.  He was frequently seen on ITV's coverage of British Wrestling.

Early life
Lagey was a ballet dancer in Les Ballets Nègres, the first all-black dance company in Europe. His mother was a strongwoman in a German circus, and may have been possibly Europe's first female professional wrestler.

Professional wrestling career
Kwango wrestled from the late 1940s to the 1980s, and was famous for his head-butt moves. He achieved fame in Britain through televised matches on ITV, but also enjoyed popularity in Europe, the Middle East, and Africa. He also worked as a referee during the 1980s.

Personal life
Lagey was an accomplished drummer and pianist, playing in various nightclubs in London with his brother, Cyril, who was a musician with the comedy orchestra known as Sid Millward and His Nitwits. Lagey's older brother, Butcher Johnson, was also a wrestler. Lagey's hobbies included photography, cars, amateur radio, and collecting jazz records. He lived in Peckham and died of cancer at the age of 74. He was survived by his six children.

In popular culture
Kwango was the subject of a song by the Bevis Frond and was namechecked in the Half Man Half Biscuit song "Prag Vec at the Melkweg".

References

External links
Profile of Johnny Kwango

English male professional wrestlers
1920 births
1994 deaths
English people of Nigerian descent
Black British sportspeople
Amateur radio people